Mary Frizzell (later Thomasson, January 27, 1913 – October 12, 1972) was a Canadian athlete who competed in the 1932 Summer Olympics.

She was born in Nanaimo, British Columbia and died in North Vancouver.

Frizzell competed for Canada in the 1932 Summer Olympics held in Los Angeles, United States in the 4x100 metres where she won the silver medal with her team mates Mildred Fizzell, Lillian Palmer and Hilda Strike who had won the silver medal on the 100 metres. In the 100 metre event Frizzell was eliminated in the semi-finals

At the 1934 British Empire Games she finished fourth in the long jump competition.

She continued to support track and field by coaching, serving on the Amateur Women's Athletic Federation and acting as the Women's commandant for the 1954 British Empire Games (Commonwealth Games).

Mary lost a long fought battle with cancer in 1972 at the age of 59. She was survived by husband Gilbert Thomasson and her daughters Louise and Vonna.

In May 2007 Mary Frizzell (Thomasson) was inducted posthumously into the British Columbia Sports Hall of Fame as a Pioneer .

External links
 sports-reference.com

1913 births
1972 deaths
Canadian female sprinters
Canadian female long jumpers
Deaths from cancer in British Columbia
Olympic track and field athletes of Canada
Athletes (track and field) at the 1932 Summer Olympics
Olympic silver medalists for Canada
Commonwealth Games competitors for Canada
Athletes (track and field) at the 1934 British Empire Games
Sportspeople from Nanaimo
Medalists at the 1932 Summer Olympics
Olympic silver medalists in athletics (track and field)